Mitscherlich's law can refer to:

 Mitscherlich's law of isomorphism, which predicts which chemical compounds have the same crystal structures
 Mitscherlich's law of physiological relations, which predicts that crop yields are related to the amount of plant food available